The 1958 Claxton Shield was the 19th annual Claxton Shield, and was held in Brisbane. The participants were South Australia, New South Wales, Victoria, Western Australia and Queensland. The series was won by Victoria claiming their sixth Shield title.

References

1958 in baseball
1958 in Australian sport
1958
July 1958 sports events in Australia
August 1958 sports events in Australia